The Neighbor is a weekly newspaper serving Fountain and Warren counties in Indiana, founded 1851.  It is published weekly on Tuesdays and is a member of the Hoosier State Press Association.

The Neighbor has previously been known as The Ledger Tribune and The Star Tribune.

External links

Newspapers published in Indiana
Fountain County, Indiana
Warren County, Indiana
Publications established in 1851
1851 establishments in Indiana